Peter Hughes (1878 – 24 June 1954) was an Irish politician. A publican and a farmer, he was a member of Louth County Council and Dundalk Urban District Council. He was first elected to Dáil Éireann at the 1921 general election as a Sinn Féin Teachta Dála (TD) for the Louth–Meath constituency.

As a supporter of the Anglo-Irish Treaty of 1921 he later went on to join Cumann na nGaedheal. He was appointed to the Cabinet in 1924, serving as Minister for Defence until 1927. Although he was a member of the government he lost his Dáil seat at the June 1927 general election, and failed to be elected in the two subsequent general elections.

He died on the 24 June 1954, at Mount Street, Dundalk, aged 75. He was predeceased by his wife, Lily McKevitt, with whom he had two sons and two daughters. He was buried at St Patrick's, Dundalk cemetery on 28 June 1954.

References

External links

 

1878 births
1954 deaths
Cumann na nGaedheal TDs
Early Sinn Féin TDs
Members of the 2nd Dáil
Members of the 3rd Dáil
Members of the 4th Dáil
Ministers for Defence (Ireland)
Politicians from County Louth